Alaiya is an luxury yacht launched by Lürssen at their yard near Rendsburg in 2018 owned by Indian steel magnate billionaire Lakshmi Mittal. Both the yacht's exterior and interior design are the work of Winch Design.

Design 
The hull is built out of steel while the superstructure is made out of aluminium with teak laid decks. The yacht is classed by Lloyd's Register and flagged in the Cayman Islands.

Amenities 
Zero speed stabilizers, gym, elevator, swimming pool, movie theatre, tender garage with a Wajer 38S  utility tender, a Wasjer 38L  limousine tenders, swimming platform, air conditioning, BBQ, beach club, spa room, helicopter landing pad, underwater lights, beauty salon.

Performance
She is powered by twin 4,963hp MTU (20V 4000 M73L) diesel engines.

Owners

See also
 List of motor yachts by length
 List of yachts built by Lürssen

References

2018 ships
Motor yachts
Ships built in Germany